"Onamo, 'namo!" (Serbian Cyrillic: Онамо, 'намо!) also known as the Serb Marseillaise (Српска марсељеза / Srpska marseljeza) was a popular anthem in Montenegro in the late 19th to early 20th century. The royal state anthem of Montenegro at the time was To Our Beautiful Montenegro, while the education anthem was the Hymn to Saint Sava.

The music was composed by Davorin Jenko or Franjo Vimer, partly drawing upon a song of Garibaldi's fighters, Si scopron le tombe, Si levano i morti, with words written by prince Nicholas I of Montenegro. Having words that were considered too inflammatory, evoking provocation of the Ottoman Empire, it could not be used as the official state anthem. 

In 1992 the government of Montenegro considered using it as the official anthem, but decided against it. In 2003 it was nominated to be the official anthem of Serbia and Montenegro. There are some who believe that it should become the anthem of Montenegro in the future. A variation of the song was created by the Bosnian Serbs in the beginning of the 20th century known as "Here, o'er Here!" (Ovamo, 'vamo!; Овамо, 'вамо!) dedicated to calling Montenegro and Serbia to free Bosnia and Herzegovina from Ottoman and Habsburg dominance. Onamo, 'namo! was the anthem of the Montenegrin People's Party.

Lyrics

Footnotes
 * This verse is used as a refrain after every verse when performed.
 † These verses are considered antiquated and are often left out  in contemporary renditions of the song.

Sources
 Serb Land of Montenegro: There, Over There! (initial translation by Aleksandar Rakovic; correction of first translation and the final English version by an anonymous American of Serbian origin)

References

External links
 
The Njegoskij Fund Public Project (A private family archives-based digital documentary project concerning the history and culture of the Royal Montenegro)

Anthems of Montenegro
Historical national anthems
Serbian patriotic songs
Kingdom of Montenegro
Petrović-Njegoš dynasty